The Villains World Tour was a concert tour by American rock band Queens of the Stone Age to support the band's seventh studio album, Villains, which was released in August 2017. The tour began in the U.S. on June 22, 2017, and ended in Australia on September 12, 2018. English rock band Royal Blood supported Queens of the Stone Age on the North American leg of the tour.

Tour dates

Songs performed

Queens of the Stone Age
"Regular John"
"Avon"
"How to Handle a Rope"
"Mexicola"
"You Can't Quit Me Baby"

Rated R
"Feel Good Hit of the Summer"
"The Lost Art of Keeping a Secret"
"Leg of Lamb"
"Monsters in the Parasol"
"In The Fade"
"I Think I Lost My Headache"

Songs for the Deaf
"You Think I Ain't Worth a Dollar, But I Feel Like a Millionaire"
"No One Knows"
"First It Giveth"
"A Song for the Dead"
"Hangin' Tree"
"Go with the Flow"
"Do It Again"
"A Song for the Deaf"

Lullabies to Paralyze
"Everybody Knows That You Are Insane"
"Tangled Up in Plaid"
"Burn the Witch"
"In My Head"
"Little Sister"
"I Never Came"

Era Vulgaris
"Turnin' on the Screw"
"Sick, Sick, Sick"
"Misfit Love"
"Make It wit Chu"
"3's & 7's"

...Like Clockwork
"Keep Your Eyes Peeled"
"I Sat by the Ocean"
"The Vampyre of Time and Memory"
"If I Had a Tail"
"My God is the Sun"
"Kalopsia"
"Smooth Sailing"
"I Appear Missing"

Villains
"Feet Don't Fail Me"
"The Way You Used to Do"
"Domesticated Animals"
"Fortress"
"Head Like a Haunted House"
"Un-Reborn Again"
"The Evil Has Landed"
"Villains of Circumstance"

References

2017 concert tours
2018 concert tours